Martin Guarino (born 24 October 1990 in Buenos Aires) is an Argentine professional footballer who plays for Defensores de Belgrano as a left defender.

Guarino made his league debut for Dutch side FC Zwolle on August 7, 2009, in the away match against AGOVV Apeldoorn. The game ended in a 2–0 defeat for Zwolle. At the end of the 2009–10 season, Guarino and teammate Dennis van der Wal were told that they could leave if they found a new club. Both players did not find a new club, so they stayed at the club for the 2010–11 season.

References

External links 
 Voetbal International: Martin Guarino 

1990 births
Living people
Footballers from Buenos Aires
Argentine footballers
Eerste Divisie players
Argentine expatriate footballers
Expatriate footballers in the Netherlands
PEC Zwolle players
Association football forwards
Argentine expatriate sportspeople in the Netherlands